This is a list of events in Scottish television from 1999.

Events

January
20 January – The UK government says no political pressure was applied to the BBC over its decision not to give Scotland a separate version of the Six O'Clock News.

February
No events.

March
No events.

April
30 April – Launch of the digital channel S2, the Scottish equivalent of ITV2.

May
6–7 May – Television coverage of the 1999 Scottish Parliament general election.
12 May – The Scottish Parliament meets in Edinburgh for its first session. Proceedings have been televised from the outset.

June
6 June – The final edition of political current affairs programme Scottish Lobby is broadcast on BBC2 Scotland.

July
No events.

August
No events.

September
No events.

October
1 October – Death of Lena Zavaroni, the Scottish child singer and television presenter.
4 October – Launch of Newsnight Scotland, the BBC Scotland opt-out of the main Newsnight programme on BBC Two.
31 October – Establishment of TeleG, Scotland's first daily Gaelic language digital channel.

November
8 November – Border Television drops its famous 'chopsticks' logo which it had used since it launched in 1961 when it adopts the ITV 'hearts' idents.

December
No events.

Debuts

BBC
13 January – Chewin' the Fat on BBC One Scotland (1999–2002)
4 October – Newsnight Scotland  on BBC Two Scotland (1999–2014)

Television series
Scotsport (1957–2008)
Reporting Scotland (1968–1983; 1984–present)
Scotland Today (1972–2009)
Sportscene (1975–present)
The Beechgrove Garden (1978–present)
Grampian Today (1980–2009)
High Road (1980–2003)
Taggart (1983–2010)
Crossfire (1984–2004)
Wheel of Fortune (1988–2001)
Win, Lose or Draw (1990–2004)
Telefios (1993–2000)
Only an Excuse? (1993–2020)

Ending this year
3 December – Fun House (1989–1999)
Machair (1993–1999)

Deaths
1 October – Lena Zavaroni, 35, child singer and television presenter

See also
1999 in Scotland

References

 
Television in Scotland by year
1990s in Scottish television